The Sea Wolf is a lost 1926 American silent film directed by and starring Ralph Ince. It is based on the 1904 novel The Sea-Wolf by Jack London.

Previously filmed in 1920 at Paramount as The Sea Wolf.

Cast
 Ralph Ince as 'Wolf' Larsen  
 Claire Adams as Maud Brewster  
 Theodore von Eltz as Humphrey Van Weyden  
 Snitz Edwards as Thomas Mugridge 
 Mitchell Lewis as Johansen, the Mate

References

Bibliography
 Quinlan, David. The Illustrated Guide to Film Directors. Batsford, 1983.

External links

1926 films
Films directed by Ralph Ince
American silent feature films
1920s English-language films
American black-and-white films
Films based on The Sea-Wolf
Lost American films
Producers Distributing Corporation films
Sea adventure films
1926 lost films
Lost drama films
1920s American films
Silent adventure films